Dendronotoidea is a  taxonomic superfamily of small colorful sea slugs or nudibranchs, aeolid nudibranchs.

Families
Families placed in this superfamily are as follows. 
 Bornellidae Bergh, 1874
 Dendronotidae Allman, 1845
 Dotidae Gray, 1853 
 Hancockiidae MacFarland, 1923
 Lomanotidae Bergh, 1890
 Phylliroidae Menke, 1830
 Scyllaeidae Alder & Hancock, 1855
 Tethydidae Rafinesque, 1815

References

External links
 Odhner N. H. (1934). The Nudibranchiata of British Antarctic Expedition. British Antarctic ("Terra Nova") Expedition, 1910. Natural history reports. Zoology. 7: 229-310
 Goodheart, J. A.; Bazinet, A. L.; Valdés, Á.; Collins, A. G.; Cummings, M. P. (2017). Prey preference follows phylogeny: evolutionary dietary patterns within the marine gastropod group Cladobranchia (Gastropoda: Heterobranchia: Nudibranchia). BMC Evolutionary Biology. 17(1)

Nudibranchia
Gastropod superfamilies